Father Karel Verleye, O.F.M. Cap., (17 April 1920 – 27 February 2002) co-founded the College of Europe in Bruges in 1949 with his good friend Hendrik Brugmans.

He was a Capuchin friar for 64 years. In 1945 he became philosophy lector at the Bruges seminary. He founded the Ryckevelde Foundation in 1956.

External links
Stichting Ryckevelde
College of Europe
Capuchins in Flanders, Belgium

1920 births
2002 deaths
20th-century Belgian philosophers
Academic staff of the College of Europe
Capuchins
People from Mechelen